Norman Robert Jordan (30 August 1888 – 8 November 1966) was an Australian rules footballer who played with Melbourne in the Victorian Football League (VFL). Great-grandfather of Dale Thomas.

Notes

External links 

 

1888 births
1966 deaths
Australian rules footballers from Victoria (Australia)
Melbourne Football Club players